Metacrinus is a genus of stalked crinoids in the family Isselicrinidae. Members of this genus live on hard surfaces in deeper parts of the ocean. The genus has extant species and is also represented in the fossil record.

Species
The World Register of Marine Species lists the following species in the genus:

Metacrinus costatus Carpenter, 1884
Metacrinus interruptus Carpenter, 1884
Metacrinus levii Améziane-Cominardi, 1990
Metacrinus musorstomae Roux, 1981
Metacrinus nodosus Carpenter, 1884
Metacrinus rotundus Carpenter, 1885
Metacrinus serratus Döderlein, 1907
Metacrinus wyvillii Carpenter, 1884
Metacrinus zonatus AH Clark, 1908

References

Isselicrinidae
Crinoid genera